is a retired judoka from Japan, who represented his native country at the 1984 Summer Olympics in Los Angeles, California. Matsuoka won the gold medal in the men's half-lightweight division (– 65 kg), after having defeated South Korea's Hwang Jung-Oh in the final by Seoi Nage. He trained under 4 time world champion Shozo Fujii (1971–1979).

As of 2007, Matsuoka coaches the Komatsu Limited judo club. Among his students are world champions & olympic medalists Ayumi Tanimoto, Miku Tashiro, and Tsukasa Yoshida.

References 

  Profile

Japanese male judoka
Judoka at the 1984 Summer Olympics
Olympic judoka of Japan
Olympic gold medalists for Japan
1957 births
Living people
Sportspeople from Hyōgo Prefecture
Place of birth missing (living people)
Olympic medalists in judo
Komatsu Limited
Medalists at the 1984 Summer Olympics
20th-century Japanese people
21st-century Japanese people